Ángela García may refer to:

 Angela Garcia Combs (born 1962), American writer and director
  (born 1944), Spanish painter
  (1903–1992), Spanish chemist
 Ángela García de Paredes (born 1958), Spanish architect
 Ángela García Rives (fl. 1891–1961), Spanish librarian